Monaco competed at the 2014 Summer Youth Olympics, in Nanjing, China from 16 August to 28 August 2014.

Judo

Monaco was given a quota to compete by the tripartite committee.

Individual

Team

References

2014 in Monégasque sport
Nations at the 2014 Summer Youth Olympics
Monaco at the Youth Olympics